Kouka Margni is a sub-prefecture of Guéra Region in Chad.

Demographics 
Ethnic composition by canton in 2016:

Moubi Goz Canton (population: 30,475; villages: 32):

References 

Populated places in Chad